Geococcus is a monotypic genus of flowering plants belonging to the family Brassicaceae. It only contains one species, Geococcus pusillus J.Drumm. ex Harv. 

Its native range is southern and south-eastern Australia.

References

Brassicaceae
Brassicaceae genera
Flora of Australia